Ahmad bin Hamzah (Jawi: أحمد بن حمزة; born 27 September 1948) is a Malaysian politician who served as Deputy Minister of Agriculture and Food Industries I for the second term in the Barisan Nasional (BN) administration under former Prime Minister Ismail Sabri Yaakob and former Minister Ronald Kiandee from August 2021 to the collapse of the BN administration in November 2022 and the first term in the Perikatan Nasional (PN) administration under former Prime Minister Muhyiddin Yassin and former Minister Ronald from March 2020 to the collapse of the PN administration in August 2021, Member of Parliament (MP) for Jasin from March 2008 to November 2022 and Member of the Melaka State Legislative Assembly (MLA) for Serkam from April 1995 to March 2008. He is a member of the United Malay National Organisation (UMNO), a component party of the BN coalition.  

Ahmad was elected to federal Parliament in the 2008 election, having been nominated by UMNO to contest the Jasin seat ahead of its incumbent member Mohammad Said bin Yusof. Before entering the federal parliament, Ahmad was previously a three terms member of the Malacca State Legislative Assembly for the seat of Serkam .

Ahmad retained the Jasin seat in the 2013 and 2018 general elections consecutively.

Election results

Honours
  :
  Knight Commander of the Exalted Order of Malacca (DCSM) – Datuk Wira (2004)
  Grand Commander of the Exalted Order of Malacca (DGSM) – Datuk Seri (2016)

See also
 Jasin (federal constituency)

References

Living people
1948 births
People from Malacca
Members of the Dewan Rakyat
Members of the Malacca State Legislative Assembly
United Malays National Organisation politicians
Malaysian people of Malay descent
Malaysian Muslims
21st-century Malaysian politicians